Mark David Iwanowski (born September 8, 1955) is a former American football tight end who played for the New York Jets of the National Football League (NFL). He played college football at University of Pennsylvania.

References 

1955 births
Living people
American football tight ends
People from Hazleton, Pennsylvania
Players of American football from Pennsylvania
Penn Quakers football players
New York Jets players